+ Crataegomespilus is the generic name applied to graft-chimeras between the genera Crataegus and Mespilus. It should not be confused with × Crataemespilus, which is applied to sexual hybrids between those genera, nor with Chamaemespilus which is a segregate genus or subgenus of Sorbus.

References

External links
 

Maleae
Graft chimeras